Boussouma Department may refer to:
Boussouma Department, Sanmatenga, Burkina Faso
Boussouma Department, Boulgou, Burkina Faso

Department name disambiguation pages